Hans Bourquin (16 October 1914 – 1998) was a Swiss rowing coxswain who won the gold medal in the coxed pairs at the 1928 Summer Olympics, aged 13.

References

1914 births
1998 deaths
Swiss male rowers
Coxswains (rowing)
Olympic rowers of Switzerland
Rowers at the 1928 Summer Olympics
Olympic gold medalists for Switzerland
Olympic medalists in rowing
Medalists at the 1928 Summer Olympics